Clannad is a Japanese visual novel developed by Key and released on April 28, 2004 for Windows. While both of Key's first two previous works, Kanon and Air, had been released first as adult games and then censored for the younger market, Clannad was specifically made for all ages. It was later ported to the PlayStation 2, PlayStation Portable, Xbox 360, PlayStation 3, PlayStation Vita, PlayStation 4 and Nintendo Switch consoles. An English version for Windows was released on Steam by Sekai Project in 2015.

The story follows the life of Tomoya Okazaki, from adolescence to adulthood. As an average high school student, he meets many people in his last year at school, including five girls whose individual problems he helps resolve, and his life is further detailed after graduating from high school. The gameplay of Clannad follows a plot that branches into different scenarios based on various courses of interaction by the player character. The game was ranked as the best-selling PC game sold in Japan for the time of its release, and charted in the national top 50 several more times afterwards. Key went on to produce an adult spin-off titled Tomoyo After: It's a Wonderful Life in November 2005, which expanded on the scenario of Tomoyo Sakagami, one of the five heroines from Clannad.

Clannad has made several transitions to other media. There have been four manga adaptations published by ASCII Media Works, Flex Comix, Fujimi Shobo and Jive. Comic anthologies, light novels and art books have also been published, as have audio dramas and several albums of music. An animated film adaptation by Toei Animation was released in September 2007, followed by two anime television series including two original video animation (OVA) episodes by Kyoto Animation produced between 2007 and 2009. Both anime series and their accompanying OVAs are licensed by Sentai Filmworks and were released in North America in 2009. The animated adaptations have received high sales figures in Japan as well as critical acclaim abroad.

Gameplay

Clannad is a drama and romance visual novel in which the player assumes the role of Tomoya Okazaki. Much of its gameplay is spent on reading the story's narrative and dialogue. Clannad follows a branching plot line with multiple endings; depending on the decisions that the player makes during the game, the plot will progress in a specific direction.

There are six main plot lines that the player will have the chance to experience, five which are initially available. Throughout gameplay, the player is given multiple options to choose from, and text progression pauses at these points until a choice is made. To view all plot lines in their entirety, the player must replay the game multiple times and make different choices to change the plot progression.

When first playing the game, the scenarios for all five heroines and additional smaller scenarios are available in what is called the School Life story arc. When the player completes a character's scenario, he or she receives an orb of light. When eight of these lights are obtained, the game's second story arc, called After Story, is made available. One of the lights disappears during School Life, but reappears in After Story. To view the true ending of Clannad, all 13 lights must be obtained. Originally, the lights were meant to be items that players could use in the game, but since this increased the game's complexity, and detracted from the storyline, the function of the lights was simplified and made less intrusive.

Story

Setting and themes
The first half of the story takes place primarily at Hikarizaka Private High School, a fictional school located in Japan. Outside of the school, frequented locations include the bakery run by Nagisa's parents, and the dormitory where Youhei Sunohara lives. Throughout the story, glimpses into an Illusionary World are shown. This world is devoid of all life except for a young girl, though she later makes a body out of junk pieces through which the player can interact with her. The remaining half of the story takes place in the same city, after the conclusion of the first half. While the town's name was never directly mentioned, one can infer that the town's name is Hikarizaka based on the many companies and establishments that share this name.

There are recurring themes that appear throughout the story. The main theme is the value of having a family, as the title of the series implies because the main scenario writer Jun Maeda mistakenly thought the name of the Irish band Clannad meant "clan" or "family" in Irish, which is just "clann". Of the six main characters, Tomoya, Nagisa, and Kotomi have no siblings, though their parents are major factors in their stories. Nagisa's story was written to incorporate what Maeda described as a "perfect family" with a focus on mental consciousness. Tomoya's and Nagisa's characters were written in a style to exemplify a "growth to adulthood" by the end of the story. Fuko's and Kyou's stories have their sisters playing an integral part, and Tomoyo's story is influenced by her entire family. A minor motif of Irish words continues with the opening theme of the game, "Mag Mell", which means roughly "plain of joy" and is connected with Irish mythology. The arrange album, a short music CD that contained remixed versions of songs in the game, that was bundled with the original game release was titled Mabinogi, which was a collection of prose stories from medieval Welsh manuscripts.

Main characters

The player assumes the role of Tomoya Okazaki, the protagonist of Clannad. Tomoya has been labeled a delinquent; at the beginning of the story, he even expresses hatred toward the city he has lived in all his life where Clannad is set. He is very straightforward in his comments to others and will not hesitate to speak his mind, even if he comes off as rude during such times. Despite this, Tomoya is loyal to his friends, and has been known to dedicate himself for those around him in need of help or support. He generally has a selfless personality and does not ask much from others in return for what he does for them.

Tomoya meets Nagisa Furukawa, the main heroine of Clannad, at the onset of the story. Nagisa is a shy, lonely girl who has an illness which causes her to rely on those around her for support. Bullied by her schoolmates, she lacks the courage to make new friends. She has developed the strange habit of muttering the names of favorite foods that she plans to eat as a way to motivate herself, such as anpan. Kyou Fujibayashi, another of Clannad heroines, is an aggressive girl well known as a good cook among her friends and family. When angered, she does not hesitate to throw a dictionary at people that she often carries around for such purposes. Despite this attitude, she also has a more subdued side, especially towards her younger fraternal twin sister Ryou Fujibayashi.

Tomoya meets a genius girl named Kotomi Ichinose, one day in the school library. She is ranked in the top 10 throughout the whole country in standardized exam results of every subject—she always goes to library to read extra materials, especially books in foreign languages. Kotomi is a tacit girl with poor social skills and it is quite difficult to communicate with her; Kotomi can even completely ignore someone when reading, even if they make loud disturbances around her. Clannad fourth heroine is a second-year student named Tomoyo Sakagami who transfers into Tomoya's school. Tomoyo is known to be a strong fighter, preferring to use kicking over punching, and is athletic. Although Tomoya is older than her, Tomoyo does not show him respect as a senior student. Tomoyo appears in Key's fifth game, Tomoyo After: It's a Wonderful Life, as the main heroine.

The last heroine in Clannad is a first-year student named Fuko Ibuki who is hyperactive and childish, before she met Tomoya, was generally seen alone by herself making wood carvings of starfish with a small knife to give to others as presents. Fuko is extremely enthralled by starfish, or things that are star-shaped, and will often go into short euphoric bouts where her awareness of her surroundings is completely overtaken.

Plot
Clannad story revolves around Tomoya Okazaki, a third year high school student who dislikes his life. Tomoya's mother (Atsuko) died when Tomoya was young, leaving his father (Naoyuki) to raise him. After the accident, Tomoya's father turned to alcohol and gambling, and had frequent fights with his son. One day, Naoyuki, while arguing with his son, slammed Tomoya against the window, dislocating Tomoya's shoulder. This injury prevents Tomoya from playing on the basketball team, and causes him to distance himself from others. Ever since then, his father has treated Tomoya nicely, but distantly, as if Tomoya and he were strangers rather than a family. This hurts Tomoya more than his previous relationship with his father, and the awkwardness of returning home leads Tomoya constantly to stay out all night. Thus his delinquent life begins. Tomoya's good friend Youhei Sunohara, who was thrown out of the soccer club over a dispute with his seniors, is also a delinquent and often hangs out in his dorm room with Tomoya doing nothing much.

The story opens on Monday April 14, 2003 at the beginning of the school year, when Tomoya meets Nagisa Furukawa, a strange girl who is one year older than he is but is repeating her last year in high school due to being sick much of the previous year. Her goal is to join the drama club which she was unable to do due to her sickness, but they find that the drama club was disbanded after the few remaining members graduated. Since Tomoya has a lot of time to kill, he helps Nagisa in reforming the drama club. During this period, Tomoya meets and hangs out with several other girls whom he gets to know well and help with their individual problems.

After Story
In the second part of the story, which starts immediately after the end of the first part but extends into the next seven years, Tomoya and Nagisa start living together, and eventually get married. Tomoya has to endure several hardships that the family has been suffering from, especially Nagisa's illness. Just after Nagisa gives birth to their daughter Ushio, she dies, which causes Tomoya to become severely depressed. He is barely able to function, let alone look after an infant. As a result, Nagisa's parents, Akio and Sanae, take care of their granddaughter. Five years later, Tomoya meets with Shino Okazaki, his paternal grandmother. Shino tells Tomoya of his father's traumatic past, which is eerily similar to Tomoya's current situation. Afterwards, Tomoya resolves to raise Ushio and acknowledges Naoyuki as his father. Shortly after Tomoya overcomes his depression, Ushio is stricken with the same disease that Nagisa had. Tomoya, Sanae and Akio struggle to save her—Tomoya even quits his job—but all of their efforts turn out to be in vain. In the coming winter, wanting to do anything for his daughter, Tomoya takes her on a trip, but she dies shortly after.

In the first few dreams, he sees a world devoid of all life, except for one girl. Each time he dreams, he finds out more about the world. Tomoya discovers that the girl has a special ability to fuse junk together to create new things, which she uses to create a body for him. Over time, Tomoya comes to the conclusion that only the two of them are "alive". To pass time, Tomoya and the girl try to build another doll with more junk they find, but as it has no soul, it fails to come to life. Remembering the distant world where he came from, Tomoya convinces the girl to build a ship so that the two can escape the approaching winter and continue to live a happy life. Eventually, winter sets in, and the girl becomes cold to the point where she cannot move any more. The girl tells Tomoya that he has another chance to go back and make things right. To do so, he must collect certain "lights" (symbols of happiness) similar to those floating around in the Illusionary World. If all the "lights" are collected throughout both story parts, a chance to save Nagisa from dying will become available, as well as the true ending, where she survives and lives with Tomoya and Ushio.

Development
The executive producer for Clannad was Takahiro Baba from Visual Arts, the publishing company which controls Key. Jun Maeda, who was one of three main scenario writers with Kai, and Yūichi Suzumoto, led the planning for Clannad and wrote the majority of the scenarios. Scenario assistance was provided by Tōya Okano. Itaru Hinoue headed the art direction, and also worked on the character design. Miracle Mikipon, Mochisuke, Na-Ga, and Shinory supplemented the computer graphics. Torino provided the background art. The game's music was composed by Maeda, Shinji Orito, and Magome Togoshi.

For Key's second visual novel Air, Maeda admitted he felt he was able to write what he wanted to for the game's scenario, but he later discovered that Air was difficult for players to receive and experience. Due to this, Maeda felt that for Key's next work Clannad, he had a sense of duty to make the game easier to receive for as many users as possible. In any case, he wanted to make it an entertaining game, and started planning on Clannad almost immediately after Airs completion. From the start of Clannads planning, Maeda did not want to write a story like in Air, but instead wanted to focus on writing a deep connection between the 'people and the town', and 'humanity'. Maeda noted that he exceeded his writing ability when writing most of the scenarios in Clannad, and equates Clannads writing process as a "wall that I will never be able to get over again." While at the beginning Maeda felt he was prepared, the entire game's story started to increase to a level Maeda never predicted, and Suzumoto noted that it approximately doubled in size from the original projected length. Suzumoto attributed the increase due to the lengthening structure of the game's base scenario which caused the 'branch' scenarios to increase as well.

There were more concerns about Clannad being similar to Air. When Nagisa's scenario was being written, there were some disputes concerning the length of her scenario, and thus putting too much focus on the main heroine. Some were concerned that having a single prominent character with a unique storyline would be too much like how Air was structured with the overall focus on Misuzu Kamio. Takahiro Baba, the company president of VisualArt's, is even noted as suggesting to minimize the differences between the other characters' scenarios, but this was ultimately ignored since Maeda thought the game's evaluation by players would not decrease on account of the scenarios being vastly different, and thought the end result was a good one. Maeda was concerned that the After Story arc, mainly a continuation of Nagisa's scenario, would eclipse the entire game's scenario, much like what happened with Air according to Maeda. In order to prevent the same thing happening in Clannad, Maeda focused on making the first half of the story, the School Life arc, just as enjoyable by making it long and heart-breaking. Clannad is Key's second longest work, as reported by Yūto Tonokawa where he stated that Clannad is about 4,000 words fewer than Key's 2008 game Little Busters! Ecstasy.

Release history
Key announced in 2001 a release date of 2002 for Clannad and, after several postponements, Clannad was released on April 28, 2004 as a limited edition version, playable on a Windows PC as a DVD. The limited edition came bundled with the remix album Mabinogi remixing background music tracks featured in the visual novel. The regular edition was released on August 6, 2004; While Clannad originally had no voice acting, Key released a version for Windows titled Clannad Full Voice on February 29, 2008 with full voice acting (except for Tomoya). Clannad Full Voice contained one new CG, and had updated support for Windows Vista PCs. Clannad Full Voice was re-released by Key under the name Clannad on July 31, 2009 in a box set containing five other Key visual novels called Key 10th Memorial Box. An updated version compatible for Windows 7 PCs titled Clannad Memorial Edition was released on May 28, 2010.

Clannad was released for Windows on Steam by Sekai Project in English on November 23, 2015. In November 2014, Sekai Project used the crowdfunding website Kickstarter to raise funds to produce the English translation of Clannad. After less than 24 hours, the project reached its goal of US$140,000. When the Kickstarter campaign reached its US$320,000 stretch goal, Sekai Project announced that they would also be translating and releasing the Hikari Mimamoru Sakamichi de side stories for Windows. Overall, the Kickstarter campaign raised US$541,161, exceeding all of its stretch goals. Hikari Mimamoru Sakamichi de was released on Steam on June 2, 2016 titled Clannad Side Stories.

The first consumer console port of the game was released for the PlayStation 2 (PS2) on February 23, 2006 by Interchannel. The PS2 version was re-released as a "Best" version on July 30, 2009. The PS2 version was bundled in a "Key 3-Part Work Premium Box" package together with the PS2 versions of Kanon and Air released on July 30, 2009. An Xbox 360 version was released on August 28, 2008 also by Prototype. A PlayStation 3 (PS3) version was released by Prototype on April 21, 2011. A downloadable version of the PS3 release via the PlayStation Store was released by Prototype on February 14, 2013.

A version produced by NTT DoCoMo playable on FOMA mobile phones was released by Prototype through VisualArt's Motto on November 26, 2007. Prototype later released a version playable on SoftBank 3G phones on January 16, 2008. A version playable on Android devices was released on September 18, 2012. A PlayStation Portable (PSP) version of the game was released in Japan on May 29, 2008 by Prototype, which included the additions from the Windows full voice version. The limited edition release of the PSP and Xbox 360 versions came bundled with a "digest" edition of the drama CD series released by Prototype containing five separate stories each; the CD bundled with the PSP release is different from the CD bundled with the Xbox 360 version. Prototype also released a port of the game for the PlayStation Vita on August 14, 2014 to mark the 10-year anniversary of the game. Prototype released a PlayStation 4 port on June 14, 2018 with text support for both Japanese and English. Prototype released a Nintendo Switch port on July 4, 2019, again with text support for both Japanese and English, and a digital release of the game became available on the Nintendo eShop on the same day. A physical release of the Switch port will receive a limited physical release in a regular and collector's edition via Limited Run Games for a six-week preorder period from April 14 to May 29, 2020.

Adaptations

Books and publications
A magazine-sized 39-page book called pre-Clannad was published by SoftBank Creative on April 15, 2004. The book contained images from the visual novel, and short explanations of the characters, along with production sketches and concept drawings. A 160-page visual fan book was published by Enterbrain on October 12, 2004 which contained detailed story explanations, computer graphics, sheet music for the opening and ending themes, and interviews from the creators. Near the end of the book contains original illustrations of Clannad characters from various artists, three additional chapters of the Official Another Story, and production sketches.

A set of 14 illustrated short stories which added to Clannad story were serialized between the September 2004 and October 2005 issues of ASCII Media Works' Dengeki G's Magazine. Titled , there were 13 regular chapters and one extra bonus chapter. The installments were written by Key's scenario staff and each story was accompanied by illustrations by Japanese artist GotoP. Two more stories were included when they were collected into a 103-page bound volume released on November 25, 2005.

Hikari Mimamoru Sakamichi de was later re-released via SoftBank 3G and FOMA mobile phones produced by Prototype through VisualArt's Motto starting in January 2008. One chapter was released weekly with the SoftBank 3G releases three weeks behind the version for FOMA phones. The collection was released as downloadable content via Xbox Live for the Xbox 360 version of Clannad released on August 28, 2008. Prototype again re-released the short story collection, this time on the PSP in two volumes, each containing eight chapters and including the original art by GotoP. The first volume was released on June 3, 2010 and the second followed on July 15, 2010; the re-release is described by the developers as a "visual sound novel". Prototype released the short story collection as downloadable content on July 6, 2011 for the PS3 version of Clannad. Hikari Mimamoru Sakamichi de was released in two volumes on Android devices: the first volume on November 30, 2011, and volume two on April 11, 2012. Prototype ported it to the Nintendo Switch on May 20, 2021 with text support for both Japanese and English.

Two Clannad anthology character novels were written by several authors and published by Jive in September and December 2004. The first volume of a short story anthology compilation series written by Hiro Akizuki and Mutsuki Misaki titled  was released in November 2008 published by Harvest; the third volume was released in October 2009. Three volumes of a short story compilation series by several authors titled Clannad SSS were published by Harvest between June and August 2009. Harvest published a novel titled Clannad Mystery File in August 2010 and another novel titled Clannad: Magic Hour in December 2010.

Manga
The first manga illustrated by Juri Misaki titled Clannad Official Comic was serialized in Jive's manga magazine Comic Rush between the May 2005 and April 2009 issues. Jive published eight tankōbon volumes between November 7, 2005 and March 7, 2009. The second manga, titled Official Another Story Clannad: Hikari Mimamoru Sakamichi de and illustrated by Rino Fujii, was serialized between June 21, 2007 and August 21, 2008 in Flex Comix's Comi Digi + magazine, and contained 11 chapters. The story for the second manga was adapted from the Clannad short story collection of the same name. The first volume for Official Another Story Clannad was released by Broccoli on February 21, 2008 in a limited and regular edition, each with their own cover. The limited edition comes bundled with a small black notebook with the school emblem of Tomoya's school on the cover. In order to commemorate the sale, an autograph session with the manga's illustrator signing copies was held on March 2, 2008 at Gamers in Nagoya, Japan. The second and final volume, again in limited and regular editions, was released on December 20, 2008.

A third Clannad manga illustrated by Shaa began serialization in the August 2007 issue of ASCII Media Works' Dengeki G's Magazine, published on June 30, 2007. The manga ended serialization in Dengeki G's Magazine in the July 2009 issue, and was serialized in Dengeki G's Festival! Comic between October 26, 2009 and April 28, 2014. ASCII Media Works published five volumes for Shaa's Clannad manga under their Dengeki Comics imprint between February 27, 2008 and July 26, 2014. A fourth manga, titled Clannad: Tomoyo Dearest and illustrated by Yukiko Sumiyoshi, was serialized between February 20 and August 20, 2008 in Fujimi Shobo's Dragon Age Pure magazine. The story centers on Tomoyo's arc from the Clannad visual novel. A single volume for Clannad: Tomoyo Dearest was released on October 9, 2008.

There have also been four sets of manga anthologies produced by different companies and drawn by a multitude of different artists. The first volume of the earliest anthology series, released by Ohzora under the title Clannad, was released in June 2004 under their Twin Heart Comics imprint. Volumes for this series continued to be released until April 2005 with the fifth volume. The second anthology was released in a single volume by Jive on January 25, 2005 titled Clannad Comic Anthology: Another Symphony. The third anthology series was released in two volumes by Ichijinsha on June 25, 2004 and July 24, 2004 under their DNA Media Comics; a third special volume was released much later on December 25, 2007. The first volume of the last anthology series, a collection of four-panel comic strips released by Enterbrain under the title Magi-Cu 4-koma Clannad, was released on February 25, 2008 under their MC Comics imprint; the tenth volume in the series was released on August 26, 2009. Each of the anthology series are written and drawn by an average of 20 people per volume.

Drama CDs
There are two separate sets of drama CDs based on the Clannad series. The first set, produced by Frontier Works, contains five CDs each focusing on a different heroine in Clannad story ranging from Nagisa, to Kotomi, Fuko, Kyou, and Tomoyo. The first volume was released in Japan on April 25, 2007 as a limited edition with an extra track added. The second through fifth volumes followed in one month increments between May 25, 2007 and August 24, 2007. The second set, produced by Prototype, contains four CDs; the first was released on July 25, 2007. Volumes two through four were released in one month intervals after that, with the last being released on October 24, 2007. Each CD is based on the stories from the Official Another Story Clannad: Hikari Mimamoru Sakamichi de collection. The artist GotoP, who provided the illustrations for the short stories, also illustrates the drama CD covers. The drama CDs, with text and visuals, are available as downloadable content via Xbox Live and the PlayStation Store when playing the Xbox 360 and PS3 versions of Clannad, respectively.

Film

Toei Animation (the same team who worked on the original Kanon anime and Air film) announced at the Tokyo Anime Fair on March 23, 2006 that an animated film would be produced. The Clannad film was released on September 15, 2007, directed by the same director of the Air film, Osamu Dezaki, and the screenplay was written by Makoto Nakamura. The film is a reinterpretation of the Clannad storyline which centers on the story arc of the female lead Nagisa Furukawa. The film was released on DVD in three editions: the Collector's Edition, the Special Edition, and the Regular Edition on March 7, 2008. Sentai Filmworks released an English-subbed and dubbed version of the film in March 2011.

Anime series

On March 15, 2007, the Japanese television station BS-i announced a Clannad anime series via a short 30-second teaser trailer that was featured at the end of the final episode of the second Kanon anime series. Clannad is produced by Kyoto Animation, directed by Tatsuya Ishihara, and written by Fumihiko Shimo, who also worked on other adaptations of Key's visual novels Air and Kanon. The anime aired between October 4, 2007 and March 27, 2008, containing 23 aired episodes out of a planned 24; the broadcast time was first announced on August 11, 2007 at the TBS festival Anime Festa, which is also when the first episode was showcased. The anime series was released in a set of eight DVD compilations released between December 19, 2007 and July 16, 2008 by Pony Canyon, with each compilation containing three episodes. Of the 24 episodes, 23 were aired on television with the first 22 being regular episodes, followed by an additional extra episode. The last episode was released as an original video animation (OVA) on the eighth DVD on July 16, 2008 and is set in an alternate universe from the anime series where Tomoya and Tomoyo are dating, which is based on Tomoyo's scenario in the game. The OVA episode was previewed on May 31, 2008 for an audience of four-hundred people picked via a mail-in postcard campaign. A Blu-ray Disc (BD) box set of Clannad was released on April 30, 2010.

After the ending of the 23rd episode of the first Clannad anime series, a 15-second teaser trailer aired promoting a second season titled Clannad After Story. The anime is again animated by Kyoto Animation, and animates the After Story arc from the visual novel, which is a continuation of Nagisa's story, into 24 episodes. The same staff and cast from the first anime were used and the series broadcast in Japan between October 3, 2008 and March 26, 2009. Of the 24 episodes, 22 are regular episodes, the 23rd is an extra episode, and the last episode is a summary episode showcasing highlights from the series. The episodes were released on eight DVD compilation volumes between December 3, 2008 and July 1, 2009. The eighth DVD volume came with an additional OVA episode set in an alternate universe from the anime series where Tomoya and Kyou are dating. The OVA episode was previewed on May 24, 2009 to a limited number of people. A BD box set of Clannad After Story was released on April 20, 2011 in Japan with English subtitles.

In 2008, Section23 Films through Sentai Filmworks licensed the Clannad anime series, and ADV Films localized and distributed the television series and the OVA starting with the first half season box set consisting of 12 episodes with English subtitles, Japanese audio, and no English language track, which was released on March 3, 2009. The second half season box set containing the remaining episodes was released on May 5, 2009. Sentai Filmworks licensed the Clannad After Story anime series; Section23 Films localized and distributed both the television series and OVA starting with the first half season box set with English subtitles released on October 20, 2009. The second half box set was released on December 8, 2009. Sentai Filmworks re-released Clannad in a complete collection set on June 15, 2010, which featured an English dub, produced at Seraphim Digital. The English dub premiered on March 25, 2010 on the Anime Network. Sentai Filmworks re-released Clannad After Story with an English dub on April 19, 2011, and re-released Clannad on BD in November 2011. In the UK and Ireland, Clannad was released on DVD on August 5, 2013, and Clannad After Story was released on September 9, 2013 by Manga Entertainment. Funimation released Clannad and Clannad After Story on Blu-ray in the UK and Ireland on April 26, 2021.

The opening theme for the first season is Mag Mell' (cuckool mix 2007)" by Eufonius, a remix of the song Mag Mell' (cockool mix)", featured on the third disc of the game's original soundtrack, which is itself a remix of the game's opening theme . The ending theme is "Torch", and both the opening and ending themes are sung by Lia. The rest of the soundtrack for both anime series is sampled from several albums released for the Clannad visual novel including the Clannad Original Soundtrack, Mabinogi, -Memento-, Sorarado, and Sorarado Append. The cover art for Sorarado Append is also visible as the last shot in the ending video animation of the first season.

Internet radio shows
An Internet radio show to promote the Clannad anime series called  was broadcast between October 5, 2007 and October 3, 2008, containing 52 episodes. The show, produced by Onsen and Animate TV, was hosted by Mai Nakahara, who played Nagisa Furukawa in the anime, and Kikuko Inoue, who played Sanae Furukawa, and was streamed online every Friday. Several voice actors from the anime adaptation appeared on the show as guests who included Ryō Hirohashi (as Kyou), Atsuko Enomoto (as Yukine), Akemi Kanda (as Ryou), Yuichi Nakamura (as Tomoya), and Daisuke Sakaguchi (as Youhei). A two-disc CD compilation containing the show's first 13 broadcasts was produced on June 18, 2008. The second two-disc CD compilation containing the 14th through 26th broadcasts was released on October 15, 2008, and a third CD volume followed on November 19, 2008. A fourth and final volume was released on February 18, 2009 containing the rest of the broadcasts.

A second Internet radio show to promote the Clannad After Story anime series called  was broadcast between October 10, 2008 and April 10, 2009, containing 26 episodes. The show was also produced by Onsen and Animate TV, and was streamed online every Friday. The show had three hosts including the previous two plus Ryōtarō Okiayu who plays Akio Furukawa in the anime series. Two two-disc CD compilations were released containing the second radio shows broadcasts, the first released on February 18, 2009, followed by the second on May 29, 2009.

Music

The Clannad visual novel has four pieces of theme music: one opening theme, two ending themes, and an insert song. The insert song "Ana" is sung by Lia. Six of the characters have background music leitmotifs—the five heroines, and Yukine Miyazawa.

An image song album titled Sorarado was released in December 2003 featuring songs sung by Riya. A remix album, Mabinogi, came bundled with the original release of Clannad in April 2004. The game's original soundtrack was released in August 2004 containing three discs containing 56 tracks. A follow-up to Sorarado was released in December 2004 called Sorarado Append; the songs were again sung by Riya. A remix album titled -Memento- was also released in December 2004 and contained two discs. A piano arrangement album was released in December 2005 called Piano no Mori, which contained five tracks from Clannad and five from Tomoyo After: It's a Wonderful Life. Each of the albums released for the visual novel version were released on Key's record label Key Sounds Label.

A maxi single by Eufonius was released in July 2007 for the Clannad film called "Mag Mell (frequency⇒e Ver.)". The single contained a remix version of the game's opening theme, and instrumental track of that remix, and an original track. An image album titled Yakusoku was released in August 2007 featuring a song sung by Lia, an instrumental version of that song, and two background music tracks used in the film. The film's original soundtrack was released in November 2007. The albums released for the film were produced by Frontier Works. A single for the second season anime series was released in November 2008 called "Toki o Kizamu Uta / Torch", and contains the anime's opening and ending themes sung by Lia. A remix album containing piano arrangement versions of the second anime series' opening and ending themes was released in December 2008 called "Toki o Kizamu Uta / Torch" Piano Arrange Disc. The anime series' two singles and one album are released on Key Sounds Label.

Reception

Visual novel

Across the national ranking of bishōjo games in amount sold in Japan, the Clannad limited edition Windows release premiered at number one twice since its release, and the third ranking brought the Windows release down to 46 out of 50. The first two weeks of June 2004 held the final ranking for the original release at 40 out of 50. The Clannad regular edition Windows release premiered at number 26 in the rankings. The next two rankings for the regular edition were at 37 and 41. According to sales information taken from the Japanese Amazon website, the original Windows version of Clannad sold 100,560 copies in 2004. Clannad Full Voice ranked twice in terms of highest selling PC games nationally in Japan, achieving sales rankings of 7 and 20 in February and March 2008, respectively. For the week of April 18, 2011, the PlayStation 3 port of Clannad sold 7,466 units. The console versions of Clannad had sold over 113,000 copies by April 18, 2011, and 122,393 copies . The two-volume PSP editions of Hikari Mimamoru Sakamichi de sold 28,984 copies by the end of 2010. The English release of the Windows version debuted on the Steam charts at number three, above Call of Duty: Black Ops III and Grand Theft Auto V, and just below Fallout 4 and Counter-Strike: Global Offensive.

In the October 2007 issue of Dengeki G's Magazine, poll results for the 50 best bishōjo games were released. Out of 249 titles, Clannad ranked first at 114 votes; in comparison, the second place title, Fate/stay night, got 78 votes. The PlayStation 2 release in 2006 was reviewed by the Japanese video game magazine Famitsu, which gave it an overall score of 26/40 (out of the four individual review scores of 7, 7, 6, and 6). In 2008, Clannad was voted No. 2 in the Dengeki poll of the most emotional games of all time. In 2011, Clannad was voted No. 4 in Famitsu poll of the most tear-inducing games of all time. In 2014, Sony Computer Entertainment conducted a poll with over 10,000 Japanese fans, where Clannad was voted No. 18 on the "Most Moving Games Over Books and Movies" list.

 reviewed the Windows version and scored it 9.2 out of 10. They referred to it as "one of the best visual novels ever made", praising the "rich" dialogues and storytelling, "deep" branching narrative, and "lifelike" characterization, referring to the cast as some of the best "characters ever seen" in "the world of video games." RPGFan gave it an overall score of 83%, including 88% for story, 86% gameplay, 74% control, 72% graphics, and 82% sound. The review praised the large number of dialogue choices which "lets you feel involved in how the tale plays out", "many genuinely funny moments," and "emotionally touching" stories, particularly the After Story arc where Clannad "truly excels" with "heart-wrenching" and "emotionally-charged" storytelling, but criticized it for not having enough visuals and for having some "less interesting" side-story paths in the School Life arc which require completion to unlock the After Story arc.

Anime
The two anime series and film DVDs have shown consistent high sales figures. The first anime limited edition DVD ranked third for the week of December 19 and December 25, 2007. The second through fifth limited edition DVDs all ranked first during their first week of sales, while the sixth limited edition DVD volume was ranked fourth for the week of May 21 and May 27, 2008. The seventh and eighth limited edition DVD volumes both ranked first during their first week of sales. The third limited edition DVD ranked sixth for the most anime DVDs sold between December 2007 and November 2008. A Blu-ray Disc box set of Clannad ranked third for the week of April 26 and May 2, 2010, and ranked again at 13 the following week. The special edition film DVD first ranked at number three during its first week of sales, and dropped down to number 10 the following week.

The first limited edition DVD for Clannad After Story ranked second during its first week of sales selling 17,521 units. The second through fourth limited edition DVDs for Clannad After Story ranked first during their first week of sales each selling over 16,000 units each. The fifth through seventh limited edition DVDs for Clannad After Story ranked first during their first week of sales selling over 14,000 units each. The eighth limited edition DVD for Clannad After Story ranked second during its first week of sales selling over 19,800 units. The sixth limited edition DVD volume ranked again the week of May 11 and May 17, 2009 at number three for anime DVDs. The seventh limited edition DVD volume ranked again the week of June 8 and June 14, 2009 at number six for anime DVDs. The eighth limited edition DVD volume ranked again the week of July 6 and July 12, 2009 at number five for anime DVDs.

For the anime television adaptation, the first season of Clannad received reviews ranging from positive to mixed, while the second season Clannad After Story received wide critical acclaim. The THEM Anime Reviews website gave the entire series a score of 4 out of 5 stars, with reviewer Tim Jones describing the first season as "the most fleshed-out and real Key animated adaption to date," and reviewer Stig Høgset stating that the second season After Story "will play up the tragedies and the drama considerably, quite possibly tearing out your heart in the process. This is where time truly starts to fly by, lending the show some real weight in the emotional departments."

Theron Martin of Anime News Network gave the first season a 'B+' rating, criticizing its extensive use of moe elements, but considered it appealing entertainment for a "fan base who revels in this kind of thing." His review for the second season After Story was much more positive, giving it an 'A−' rating. He praised the second half of the season as "the best-written quarter of Clannad," stating that it "effectively builds up and delivers its emotional appeal, reinforces the series' central theme (i.e. the importance of family), and peaks visually," and concluding that "only the most cynical of souls will avoid shedding at least a few tears at certain points." On the DVD Talk website, the reviewer Todd Douglass Jr. gave Clannad After Story a "Highly Recommended" rating, stating that "the range of emotions Clannad takes you through is quite daunting. It's charming, cute, hilarious, mysterious, and tragic all at the same time. Few shows are as memorable, and few are this good for this long." He concludes that the storytelling is "heartfelt" and "memorable in so many ways," and that "few shows rise to the levels this one does."

Legacy
Gamania Entertainment hosted a collaboration event with Clannad and their two massively multiplayer online games (MMOGs) Hiten Online and Holy Beast Online. Between March 26 and June 26, 2008, the two games offered costumes characters could wear which looked like the winter school uniforms from Clannad, along with offering Kyou's pet boar Botan for players to adopt. Players of either game who had a character over level 20 could enter a lottery where 500 people were chosen to win Clannad-related goods which included virtual and real-world items such as file folders, "netcash" cards, sports towels, tapestries, and various items used during gameplay.

ASCII Media Works and Vridge produced the PlayStation 2 visual novel  based on the light novel series Nogizaka Haruka no Himitsu. Released in September 2008, the game features the series' characters cosplaying in various costumes either depicting characters from five popular light novel series published by ASCII Media Works, or three Clannad heroines. Haruka Nogizaka can cosplay as Kotomi Ichinose, Mika Nogizaka can cosplay as Nagisa Furukawa (albeit with long hair), and Shiina Amamiya can cosplay as Tomoyo Sakagami. The player can also view exclusive CGs in the game if one of the girls is taken out to various places while cosplaying as one of the aforementioned five light novel series characters, or as the Clannad heroines. For example, if Mika is cosplaying as Nagisa, a CG of her eating dango can become viewable. When cosplaying as one of these tie-in characters, the voice of the girl cosplaying changes to the voice actress of the character they are cosplaying; for example, if Shiina cosplays as Tomoyo, she is voiced by Tomoyo's voice actress Houko Kuwashima.

A 3D virtual world called Ai Sp@ce was developed by the video game developer Headlock where users can interact with bishōjo game heroines from Clannad, Shuffle!, and Da Capo II. Released in October 2008, the world recreates each game franchise on its own virtual island which are linked with a central Akihabara Island where users can interact, bridging the gap between the separate franchises. Users are able to create a customizable avatar to represent themselves in the game, along with choosing one game heroine to live with, which is referred to as a character doll, or chara-doll for short. The user and chara-doll reside together on one of the three in-game "islands" depending on which franchise the heroine is from, which includes a house with furniture and clothes that can be purchased. The chara-dolls can also be customizable in that they can develop a unique personality for each user.

Characters from Clannad also appear in the Key crossover series Kaginado, which premiered in 2021.

Notes

References

External links

 Key's official Clannad website 
 Official Clannad anime website 
 Official Clannad After Story anime website 
 
 

 

2004 video games
2005 manga
2007 anime television series debuts
2007 manga
2008 anime OVAs
2008 anime television series debuts
2008 manga
2009 anime OVAs
Android (operating system) games
Anime television series based on video games
ASCII Media Works manga
Bishōjo games
Comi Digi + manga
Dengeki Comics
Dengeki G's Magazine
Enterbrain manga
Fujimi Shobo manga
High school-themed video games
Ichijinsha manga
Key (company) games
Kyoto Animation
Light novels
Manga based on video games
Nintendo Switch games
PlayStation 2 games
PlayStation 3 games
PlayStation 4 games
PlayStation Portable games
PlayStation Vita games
Prototype (company) games
Romance anime and manga
Romance video games
School life in anime and manga
Seinen manga
Sentai Filmworks
Single-player video games
Slice of life anime and manga
Video games developed in Japan 
Video games scored by Jun Maeda
Video games with alternate endings
Windows games
Xbox 360 games